Gheorghe Danielov (also Danilov, 20 April 1948 –2 August 2017) was a Romanian sprint canoeist who competed in doubles together with Gheorghe Simionov. They won a silver medal in the 1000 m event at the 1976 Olympics, placing fourth over 500 m, and four medals at the ICF Canoe Sprint World Championships with a gold (C-2 500 m: 1971) and three silvers (C-2 500 m: 1973, 1974; C-2 1000 m: 1975).

References

External links

1948 births
Canoeists at the 1976 Summer Olympics
Living people
Olympic canoeists of Romania
Olympic silver medalists for Romania
Romanian male canoeists
Olympic medalists in canoeing
ICF Canoe Sprint World Championships medalists in Canadian

Medalists at the 1976 Summer Olympics